North Sanpete School District is a public school district in the U.S. state of Utah.  The district provides education for students in the northern half of Sanpete County.  The offices for the district are located in Mount Pleasant.  There are five elementary schools, one middle school, one high school and one alternative school within the district. Enrollment in 2004 was 2,376 students.

Schools in this district

See also
South Sanpete School District

External links
District website

School districts in Utah
Education in Sanpete County, Utah